Dushasana is a 2011 Indian Telugu-language political drama film directed by Posani Krishna Murali and starring Srikanth.

Cast 
Srikanth as a common man similar to Che Guevara
Sanjjanaa
Tashu Kaushik as a news channel reporter
M. Balayya as the chief minister
Kota Srinivasa Rao, Chalapathi Rao and Tanikella Bharani as ministers
Brahmanandam
Krishna Bhagavaan
Kondavalasa Lakshmana Rao
Tarjan
Sivaji Raja
Annapoorna

Production 
This film marks the second collaboration between Srikanth and Posani Krishna Murali after Operation Duryodhana (2007).

Reception 
A critic from Deccan Herald opined that "Dushasana is best left to die an early death at the box office". A critic from 123telugu opined that "Watching Dusshaasana is like going through television news channels highlighting on some problems, and some finding quick fix solutions. Watch it if you are huge fan of Posani-ism". A critic from Filmibeat said that "The film neither has any kind of entertainment nor a good message".

References